Heiden is a municipality in the district of Borken in the state of North Rhine-Westphalia, Germany. It is located approximately 5 km east of Borken.

Its most important symbol are the devil stones.

Geography

Location 
Heiden is located in the west of the Westphalian Lowland near to the changeover to the Ruhr area in the south.
In the north of Heiden are The Mountains (Die Berge). Heiden is surrounded by many woods.

Neighbouring places 
In the north Heiden borders the city of Borken and the city of Velen, in the east borders the municipality of Reken. 
The southern border of Heiden to Dorsten is also the border to the district of Recklinghausen.

Division 
Officially, Heiden has no division. Nevertheless, there are hamlets outside the urban settlement of Heiden. On the one hand, there are the dispersed settlements of Leblich with its Hamlets Buschausen, Leblich and Heiden along the Railway Street in the south and on the other hand Nordick and Lammersfeld in the north.

History

Early history 
In one of Heidens forests (The Uhlen) you can find the devil stones (in German Teufelssteine or in Low German Düwelsteene) these are the remains of a Neolithic dolmen from 3500–2800 B.C. These are the earlist evidence of human settlement in the local area.

Foundation/Name 
Heiden was founded as the farm Heghinc. In the year 870, Heiden was first mentioned in a donation to a monastery.
During its  development to a settlement, Heiden was also named Heidion, Heithene, Hethen and finally Heyden. 
The origin of the Name Heiden is the heathland (German: Heideland), which is the natural landscape in Heidens area.

Since 1975, Heiden is a municipality.

Politics 
The parties and associations in the municipal council were voted every five years.

Patrick Voßkamp (CDU), whose term began in 2020, is the current mayor. He was preceded by Hans-Jürgen Benson (SPD), whose term began in 2015. Before 2015, the independent candidate Heiner Buß was mayor for 15 years.

Twin towns 
 Heilbad Heiligenstadt, Thuringia, 
 Lancaster, Wisconsin, 
 Rybno, Warmian-Masurian Voivodeship,

Gallery

References

External links
 Official website 

Borken (district)